Esad "Eso" Samardžić is a Bosnian businessman who spent most of his life residing in Switzerland and achieved many successes throughout his past in many different fields. He is best known as a legendary Balkan music manager, and event promoter from the years between 1980 and 2000. In his career in the balkan music business, he worked very closely with the most prominent artists such as Halid Beslic, Dino Merlin, and Halid Muslimović. Samardzic was the founder and owner of Tanoa Club, the first and most award winning International Yugoslavian/Balkan live music venue, with performances by many top Balkan artists including Šaban Šaulić; Lepa Brena; and Sinan Sakić, in Switzerland, as well as Valentino Club in Austria which both received strong national media attention from SFR Yugoslavia. While achieving great success with Balkan music, Samardzic also owned one of the largest night clubs in Switzerland called Villa Wahnsinn between 1990 and 1992 which also became one of the most famous night clubs among German, Austrian and Swiss folk-pop music.

Prior to his entertainment career, Samardzic began his path as a police officer in SFR; Sarajevo, Cazin, and Pula, during the 1970s, after finishing high school through the police academy while becoming a black belt martial artist in Jiu-Jitsu, Karate and Judo. With his dynamic physical strengths, he quickly found his passion in sports; he became an active European football player, playing for professional clubs across Europe such as NK Istra 1961, and FC St.Gallen during the early 1980s.  As a businessman, he has been involved in various ventures and industries which mainly included hospitality, entertainment, sports, and commercial real estate. His daughter is professional tennis player Ayline Samardzic.

References 
4. Bivši menadžer Index Hrvaska. Retrieved 26 January 2016

5. Eso Samardzic & Halid Beslic. Hrvati.ch Retrieved 1 May 2013

6. FIFA's Player's & Match Agent. FIFA.com. Retrieved 2 May 2013

7. CECA. Press Online. Retrieved 21 April 2013

External links 
 https://web.archive.org/web/20160919120139/http://extra-stars.com/2016/03/05/ayline-esina-postala-pobjednica-poznatog-internacionalnog-tenis-turnira-u-palma-springsu-u-kaliforniji/
 http://metavideos.com/video/6296841/training-mit-melanie-molitor-mama-von-martina-hingis-in
 https://web.archive.org/web/20160919190738/http://extra-stars.com/2016/02/28/esad-eso-samardzic-novi-album-jedina-u-izdanju-zagrebackog-euro-starsa/

1958 births
Living people
People from Cazin
Bosniaks of Bosnia and Herzegovina
Bosnia and Herzegovina businesspeople
Yugoslav male singers